The City of Shifting Waters is the first volume in the French comic book  science fiction series Valérian and Laureline created by writer Pierre Christin and artist Jean-Claude Mézières.

Synopsis

Part One: The City of Shifting Waters
After completing a mission on Venus, Valérian and Laureline are on leave. Laureline is beating her partner in a game of 3D chess when they are summoned by the Chief of the Spatio-Temporal Service. Valérian appears more eager than usual to respond to his call.

The Chief informs them that Xombul, the renegade technocrat of the First Circle of Galaxity, who attempted to take over Galaxity in Bad Dreams, has escaped captivity and fled into the Earth's past – the year 1986 – a time period agents have been forbidden to visit since the foundation of Galaxity. A nuclear explosion at the North Pole that year caused the polar ice cap to melt engulfing most of the Earth's cities. Valérian is ordered to pursue Xombul while Laureline is to remain at Galaxity until needed.

Valérian arrives in 1986, in New York in the Statue of Liberty just as it collapses under a wave and Valérian is thrown into the Hudson. He is rescued by a group of looters on a boat who take him to their base in Macy's department store. Left alone, Valérian is able to make his escape and heads for the top of the Empire State Building in the hope of being able to see something from the higher ground. That night, he spies a light in the top floor of the United Nations.

Reaching the United Nations, Valérian discovers a group of robots ransacking the UN's scientific archives. He makes to go after them but they take the lift to the ground floor – below the level of the water. Seeking underwater diving equipment to follow them, he is recaptured by the looters. They take him to their leader, Sun Rae, who has headquartered himself in the Plaza Hotel. He has commandeered a cargo ship and he and his group are filling it with as much loot as they can get their hands on before the final tsunami sweeps the city away forever. Valérian is put to work helping the looters load the ship.

Some days later, as the looters struggle to secure the ship from the rising winds, Valérian tries to make his escape. Hiding in the hold of the ship he is surprised to encounter Laureline who takes him to her hideaway in Greenwich Village. Once there, Laureline explains how she got to New York: traveling to the spatio-temporal relay in Brasilia she borrowed an aircraft and made her way to New York. She also tells Valérian that a conference at the University of Brasília has brought all the great scientific minds of the planet together there and they are now trying to save what they can of civilisation.

Valérian and Laureline return to the cargo ship and offer Sun Rae a deal: help them and he can have whatever scientific knowledge they also recover from the robots. He agrees and a team is put together to dive to find the robots. The team search the flooded subway tunnels and soon find the robots, following them to their base in Washington Heights. Entering the base, Valérian, Laureline and Sun Rae discover the robots are taking orders via a videoscreen from Xombul.  Valérian, Laureline and Sun Rae are spotted and captured by the robots. Xombul orders the robots to bring them with them to his base in the west.

Leaving in a hovercraft, the final deluge strikes New York and it's only thanks to Sun Rae's skill that they manage to make their escape from the city via the Washington Bridge. Heading west, Laureline is shocked by the devastation but Valérian reminds her that it's out of this disaster that Galaxity will be born. The hovercraft continues west towards Xombul's base...

Part Two: Earth in Flames

Transferring from the hovercraft to a tiltwing aircraft, Valérian, Laureline and Sun Rae are brought to Yellowstone National Park and a secret underground laboratory built by the US Army. There, they are greeted by Xombul, who introduces them to Schroeder, a scientist from the base that Xombul has kept prisoner. Xombul offers his captives a partnership – Sun Rae will command Xombul's troops and Valérian will be his right hand man. When both men hesitate, Xombul leads them all to a cave deep in the mountain. On the way, Schroeder pretends to stumble and slips an object into Valérian's hand.

In the cave is vast machine – the Molecular Induction Miniaturiser – capable of reducing any living object in size. Xombul places Laureline in the machine, proposing to keep her miniaturized form as a hostage to ensure Valérian's co-operation. The process begins and Xombul, absorbed in operating the machine, relaxes his attention. Valérian activates the device which emits a strong pitch, knocking out Xombul and his robots, who are connected to him by a mental link. Laureline has been miniaturized, but Schroeder explains that since the process wasn't completed, the effect will be temporary. Valérian prepares to leave with Laureline and the captive Xombul but Sun Rae decides to stay to see what he can salvage from the laboratories.

Reaching the surface, Valérian, Laureline and Schroeder find that the robots outside have not been affected by Xombul's incapacitated state and they attack. In the confusion, Xombul escapes and  Valérian, Laureline and Schroeder are forced to flee. While on the run, Laureline returns to her normal size. Evading the robots they come to an abandoned army base, where they find a jeep as well as weapons and ammunition.

Returning to the base, they manage to ambush and destroy a robot patrol and to damage the aircraft. In response the aircraft releases bubble-prisons, one of Schroeder's inventions, which ensnare the trio and start to drift back to the base. At that very moment, there is a volcanic eruption. The bubble-prisons keep all three safe from the lava that flows across the ground. Brought back to the base they find Sun Rae. He tells them that Xombul returned to the base and blasted off in a rocket. Schroeder explains that the rocket was to ferry the President of the United States to a secret space station in orbit around the Earth in the event of a nuclear war. They are able to watch Xombul at work on the station with the material stolen from the United Nations but they have no apparent means of following him.

Searching the lab, Valérian is astonished to discover what appears to be a prototype space-time machine. Schroeder informs him that he and some colleagues built it but couldn't get it to work. Examining the machine, Valérian realizes that he can make it operational with a few modifications. Before departure, he and Laureline knock Schroeder and Sun Rae unconscious so that they can't see what happens next.

Activating the space-time machine, they jump successfully to the space station. Valérian confronts Xombul: the secrets he stole from the United Nations were for the same space-time machine Valérian has just used to get to the station – he never realized Schroeder had the prototype in the lab in Yellowstone – and Xombul has built a prototype of his own. Xombul plans to build a fleet of similar space-time machines and conquer the galaxy. Despite Valérian's protestations that the machine doesn't work, Xombul steps inside and activates his machine, which explodes killing him.

Schroeder and Sun Rae come round to discover they are now just outside Brasilia. Valérian tells Schroeder he is a time traveler and that Schroeder shouldn't give up on his attempts to build a space-time machine. However, to preserve the time line, Valérian has removed the modifications he made. Valérian and Laureline make for the space-time relay in Brasilia as Schroeder addresses the gathered scientists at the University. Meanwhile, in the back streets of the city, Sun Rae plots a takeover.

Main characters
 Valérian, a spatio-temporal agent from Galaxity in the 28th century
 Laureline, originally from France in the 11th century, now a spatio-temporal agent of Galaxity in the 28th century
 The Chief of the Spatio-Temporal Service, a technocrat of the First Circle of Galaxity
 Xombul, a renegade technocrat of the First Circle of Galaxity
 Sun Rae, a musician, gangster chief from New York City in the year 1986
 Dr Schroeder, a genius scientist from the year 1986

Settings
 Venus, time unknown, the hydroponic plantations.
 Earth, 28th century, Galaxity, capital of the Terran Galactic Empire, the headquarters of the Spatio-Temporal Service.
 Earth, 1986. An explosion of hydrogen bombs at the North Pole has caused the ice cap to melt, engulfing most of the Earth's cities in a series of tsunamis. Locations visited include:
United States of America, New York, New York City, Manhattan. The deluge has flooded the city turning the streets and avenues into a network of canals not unlike Venice. The population have abandoned the city leaving it to the looters. Travel is only possible by boat or across the rooftops which, in places, have been connected with rope bridges by the looters. Galaxity's relay station is located in the Statue of Liberty. Valérian is first imprisoned in Macy's department store and then advances his search for Xombul on the top of the Empire State Building from where he discovers Xombul's robots in the United Nations. Sun Rae's base of operations is the Plaza Hotel while Laureline's hideaway is in Greenwich Village. Xombul's New York base is in Washington Heights. Valerian, Laureline and Sun Rae escape the final deluge via the Washington Bridge.
United States of America, Wyoming, Yellowstone National Park. Yellowstone is too far inland to be affected by the tidal waves but the catastrophe has upset the caldera resulting in eruptions of lava. Xombul's refuge is an underground super laboratory built by the US Army inside the Rocky Mountains similar to the Cheyenne Mountain Complex.
Low Earth Orbit, a secret space station designed as a refuge for the President of the United States in the event of a nuclear holocaust. It is from here that the surviving footage of the nuclear explosion at the North Pole was taken.
Brazil, Brasília. Saved from the catastrophe thanks to its inland, high altitude location. Galaxity have a second spatio-temporal relay here. A conference at the University of Brasília has meant that many of the Earth's best scientists were here at the time of the explosion. They are working to rebuild their shattered planet.

Notes
 This story was serialized in Pilote in two parts. Part one, The City of Shifting Waters, published in 1968, takes the story as far as the point where the main characters leave New York. Part two, Earth in Flames (Terre en Flammes), published in 1969, resumes the story with the characters en route to Yellowstone in an aircraft.
 Although not planned at the time, the events of this album ended up having a significant effect on the development of the series as a whole. When, 16 years later, as the “real” 1986 loomed, Mézières and Christin found that they would have to explain why the catastrophe at the North Pole hadn't occurred as depicted in this album. This plot line is taken up from The Ghosts of Inverloch and continues into the subsequent albums.
 Valérian's publishers, Dargaud, like to make frequent reference to the “prediction” this album made about a nuclear accident in 1986 and the coincidence that the Chernobyl incident happened the same year.
 Schroeder is based upon Julius Kelp, the character played by Jerry Lewis in the 1963 film, The Nutty Professor.

References

1970 graphic novels
Valérian and Laureline